Assam Cricket Association (ACA) is the governing body of the Cricket activities in the Assam state of India and the Assam cricket team. It is affiliated to the Board of Control for Cricket in India. The headquarters of ACA is at the Assam Cricket Association Stadium, Barsapara, Guwahati.

History

Since Assam played its first home match in 1948, it has also played first-class home matches in chronological order Shillong, Jorhat, Nowgong, Dibrugarh, Silchar, Karimganj, Hailakandi, Mangaldoi and Tinsukia.

Until the 2002–03 season, when the zonal system was abandoned, Assam formed part of Eastern Zone. It has not seen much success in the Ranji Trophy circuit but won their plate group in 2006/07 before losing the semi-final to Orissa, despite having not won a first-class match in the previous two seasons. 

In 2009–10 season Assam entered into elite group of the Ranji Trophy. In 2009-10 Ranji Trophy season Assam topped the plate group and subsequently progressed to the Super League. However, in the 2010–11 season, it ended at the bottom of its group in the Super League and face relegation to Plate League for the next season. In the 2012-13 edition of Vijay Hazare Trophy Assam played extremely well and finished runners up. In 2014-15 Ranji season Assam again promoted to Group A level.

The foundation stone of the Barsapara Cricket Stadium was laid by Chief Minister of Assam Tarun Gogoi in June 2004 and he again laid the foundation stone of the club house and stand of the stadium in July 2007 in the presence of then Board of Control for Cricket in India secretary Niranjan Shah.

In 2010, Assam Cricket Association change the Barsapara Cricket Stadium’s name in memory of the late Dr. Bhupen Hazarika.Then the president of Assam Cricket Association was Mr.Gautam Roy and Secretary was Bikash Baruah.

On 4 November 2012, the East Zone Senior Women's Interstate One-day Championship match between Assam women's cricket team and Odisha women's cricket team  became the first match to be played at the ground. In the 2013-14 Ranji Trophy season, the ground hosted four matches. Assam against Kerala was the first first-class match.

Himanta Biswa Sarma became the president of the Assam Cricket Association in June 2016 when his party man Pradip Buragohain became the secretary. Dr Sarma was also longest serving vice president of the association serving from 2002 to 2016. Anjan Dutta was longest serving President of Assam Cricket Association. In January 2019, Ramen Dutta has been elected as the president and Ex-Ranji player Devajit Saikia was named as the secretary of Assam Cricket Association in the Annual General Meeting.

Tournaments

Assam Cricket Association conducts various district, club and university level tournaments for juniors, seniors and women. Those are:
 
 Nuruddin Ahmed Trophy (Senior Inter-District)
 Assam Premier Club Championship 
 Assam T20 Challengers Trophy
 Nilay Dutta Inter-University Cricket Tournament
 JK Barooah Under 19 Inter-District Cricket Tournament 
 RG Baruah Under 16 Inter-District Cricket Tournament 
 Amarjit Sarma Under 15 Inter-District Cricket Tournament 
 Umananda Bora Under 13 Inter-District Cricket Tournament
 Kanaklata Baruah Inter-Zonal State Women's Cricket Championship
 Kanaklata Baruah Inter-District Women's Cricket Championship

Home Grounds

 Assam Cricket Association Stadium, Guwahati - hosted 2 ODI, 2 T20I
 Nehru Stadium, Guwahati - hosted 14 ODIs.
 Amingaon Cricket Ground, Amingaon
 Northeast Frontier Railway Stadium, Maligaon
 Satindra Mohan Dev Stadium, Silchar

Affiliated Members

Affiliated members of Assam Cricket Association are: North-East Frontier Railway Sports Association, Tezpur, Guwahati, Dibrugarh, Silchar DSA, Nowgong, Barpeta, Jorhat, Bongaigaon, Sivasagar, Charaideo, Golaghat, Tinsukia, Nazira, Morigaon, Goalpara, Dhubri, Biswanath, Karimganj, Hailakandi, Karbi Anglong, Dima Hasao, Kaliabor, Titabor, Margherita, Bokakhat, Rangiya, Udalguri, Kokrajhar, Lakhimpur, Hojai, Bajali, North Salmara, Bilasipara, Nalbari, Mangaldoi, Dhemaji, Naharkatia and Majuli.

References 

Cricket administration in India
Cricket in Assam
Sports organizations established in 1960
1960 establishments in Assam
Sports associations
Organisations based in Assam